Half Moon Bay is a live album by jazz pianist Bill Evans with Eddie Gómez and Marty Morell recorded at the Bach Dancing and Dynamite Society, in Half Moon Bay, California in 1973 and released on the Milestone label in 1998.

Reception
The Allmusic review by Richard S. Ginell awarded the album 4 stars and called it "some of the better live work from Evans during this period of his life". The All About Jazz review by Douglas Payne stated "Well recorded and produced, Half Moon Bay is a welcome addition to the burgeoning Bill Evans catalog and presents a compelling argument for the notability of this trio, featuring bassist Eddie Gomez, as one of the pianist's three best. Recommended".

Track listing
All compositions by Bill Evans except as indicated
 Introductions - 0:41
 "Waltz for Debby" - 6:25
 "Time Remembered" - 5:46
 "Very Early" - 6:05
 "Autumn Leaves" (Joseph Kosma, Jacques Prévert, Johnny Mercer) - 4:47
 "What Are You Doing the Rest of Your Life?" (Alan and Marilyn Bergman, Michel Legrand) - 5:17
 "Quiet Now" (Denny Zeitlin) - 5:12
 "Who Can I Turn To (When Nobody Needs Me)" (Leslie Bricusse, Anthony Newley) - 6:35
 "How My Heart Sings" (Earl Zindars) - 4:47
 "Someday My Prince Will Come" (Frank Churchill, Larry Morey) - 6:59
Recorded at Pete Douglas' Bach Dancing and Dynamite Society, in Half Moon Bay, CA on November 4, 1973.

Personnel
Bill Evans - piano
Eddie Gómez - bass
Marty Morell - drums
Technical
Pat Britt - executive producer
Pete Douglas - engineer
Jamie Putnam - album design

References

Bill Evans live albums
1998 live albums
Half Moon Bay, California
Milestone Records live albums